TitleVest Agency, LLC is a national title insurance agency headquartered in Manhattan in New York, NY. The company offers a wide range of property and title-related services and handles all transaction types, from large commercial transactions to residential purchases and mortgage refinances. In March 2015, TitleVest was acquired by First American Title Insurance Company, the largest subsidiary of First American Financial Corporation (NYSE: FAF ).

TitleVest has historically been and continues to be a policy-issuing agent for the largest title insurance underwriters in the United States. In addition to First American Title Insurance Company of New York, TitleVest also issues policies for Chicago Title Insurance Company, Fidelity National Title Insurance Company, Old Republic National Title Insurance Company, Stewart Title Insurance Company, and Commonwealth Land Title Insurance Company.

In 2010, TitleVest was listed in Inc. magazine's Inc. 5000, the magazine's annual list of the 5000 fastest-growing, private companies in the United States. Additionally, TitleVest has been named Best Title Agency by readers of the New York Law Journal in the publication's 2013, 2014 and 2015 Reader Rankings survey 

TitleVest established and maintains New York City’s largest digital library of condominium and cooperative offering plans — books containing the history of coop or condo residences as well as their rules and regulations — and currently holds more than 5,000 offering plans in its online database.

TitleVest has long been committed to leading the industry in innovative technology. ACRISasap™, for which the company was awarded a U.S. Patent, streamlines the creation of NYC ACRIS E-Tax forms, and Interactive Online Report™ (IOR) streamlines the title review and closing process.

Patents
In July 2010, TitleVest was awarded a U.S. Patent for the technology behind its ACRISasap service, which significantly reduces the amount of time involved in process E-Tax forms in ACRIS (Automated City Register Information System), a system for searching property records and viewing document images for NYC from 1966 to the present.

References

External links
Official Website
ACRISasap Website
ACRISasap Video on YouTube
TitleVest's Offering Plan Library Webpage
"Condo Plans Go Online, Easing a Burden" in The New York Times

Insurance in the United States
Property law in the United States
Real estate in the United States
Companies based in Manhattan
Companies established in 2000